Grupo de Diarios América is a consortium of 11 major newspapers in Latin America. GDA was founded in 1991 by O Globo (Brazil), La Nación (Argentina), El Mercurio (Chile), El Tiempo (Colombia), El Comercio (Ecuador), La Prensa Gráfica (El Salvador), El Universal  (México), El Comercio (Peru), El Nuevo Día (Puerto Rico), El País (Uruguay), and El Nacional (Venezuela), including these newspapers and their magazines (totaling over 150 print media outlets). GDA only has one member in each country. Brazilian newspaper Zero Hora (and its parent company, RBS) was originally also part of GDA.

See also
 European Dailies Alliance
 Leading European Newspaper Alliance
 Latin American Newspaper Association
 Asia News Network

References

External links
GDA official website

Latin American media
Newspaper associations